Wenzel Thomas Matiegka (Czech: Václav Tomáš Matějka; baptized 6 July 1773 – 19 January 1830) was a Czech composer and one of the most celebrated guitarists of the 19th century.

Life
Wenzel Thomas Matiegka was born in the town of Choceň in the Kingdom of Bohemia, then part of the Habsburg monarchy during the rule of Joseph II. Upon completion of his primary studies, he continued his musical education under Abbé Gelinek, becoming accomplished on the pianoforte while reading law at the University of Prague. After legal employment in the service of Prince Ferdinand Kinský, one of Beethoven's original sponsors, Matiegka moved to Vienna while in his late twenties, during the first years of the 19th century. There he was quickly acknowledged as a guitarist, composer and teacher of the piano.

His ready acceptance in the musical circles of Vienna was evident by those to whom he dedicated several of his chamber works. Franz Schubert, as a young man, added a cello part to Matiegka's Notturno Op. 21 (originally for flute, viola and guitar; Schubert arrangement D.96) for the important patron of music, Count Johann Karl Esterházy (1775 – 1834), an enthusiastic cellist to whom Matiegka's original music was dedicated. Indeed the work was attributed to Schubert for many years.

Matiegka married and settled in the Vienna suburb of Leopoldstadt where he was also Kapellmeister at the St. Joseph Church from 1817 until his death. He was survived by his wife and six children, none of whom took up a musical career. His output, as it is known to this day, includes 33 guitar works including solo works, transcriptions, chamber music, and lieder as well a dozen liturgical works for small orchestra, voice and organ.

Selected compositions
Guitar solo
Zwölf leichte Ländler op. 1
Sonatas opp. 2, 11, 16, 17, 23, 31
12 Pièces faciles op. 3
Fantaisie op. 4
Variations opp. 5, 6, 7, 8, 10, 27, 28, 29
12 Menuets brillantes op. 15
6 Pièces progressives op. 20
transcriptions of works by Beethoven, Mozart, Zumsteeg and others

Duos
Serenade op. 19 for violin and guitar
Trois Sérénades concertantes op. 22 for violin and guitar
Potpourri op. 30 for cello and guitar

Trios
Trio op. 18 for horn, clarinet and guitar
Notturno op. 21 for flute, viola and guitar
Grand Trio op. 24 for violin, viola and guitar
Notturno op. 25 for flute, viola and guitar
Serenade op. 26 for flute, viola and guitar

External links

Sheetmusic 
 Sheetmusic Det Kongelige Bibliotek, Denmark
 Boije Collection The Music Library of Sweden

References

1773 births
1830 deaths
18th-century Bohemian musicians
18th-century classical composers
18th-century male musicians
19th-century classical composers
19th-century Czech musicians
19th-century Czech male musicians
Austrian people of Czech descent
Composers for the classical guitar
Czech classical guitarists
Male guitarists
Czech expatriates in Austria
Czech male classical composers
Czech Romantic composers
People from Leopoldstadt
People from Choceň